Abraham Cykiert (26 April 1926 – 6 March 2009) was an Australian Holocaust survivor and Melburnian playwright and Zionist activist of the 1970s.

Abraham Cykiert was born 26 April 1926 in Łódź, Second Polish Republic. As a child, he was forced to live in Łódź Ghetto during the German occupation of Poland and then was forcibly moved first to Auschwitz death camp, from which he escaped, and then to Buchenwald. The translation of his diaries from Yiddish language was published after the war in The Manchester Guardian.

Cykiert died in Melbourne.

Bibliography

Notes

External links
 Abraham Cykiert (1926-2009)

1926 births
2009 deaths
Australian Zionists
Jewish Australian writers
Łódź Ghetto inmates
Polish emigrants to Australia
Quadrant (magazine) people
Writers from Melbourne
Australian dramatists and playwrights